Love, Bitter is a 2009 Turkish drama film co-produced and directed by A. Taner Elhan, about a literature professor caught in a dangerous love quadrangle.

Production

Plot
Orhan, who works as a literature professor at a university in Eskisehir (a city in Central Anatolia), unexpectedly ends his relationship with Ayşe whom he was planning to marry, and comes to Istanbul where he meets Oya. After living possibly the happiest days of his life with Oya, who is a photographer, Orhan finds himself in the midst of a challenging love triangle as a result of the horrible things they encounter the first days of their marriage. Meanwhile, his new student Seda, pulls Orhan towards a point of no return. Tough days are ahead for Orhan whose life is turned upside down, torn between three women.

Release

General release

Festival screenings
 29th International Istanbul Film Festival (April 3–18, 2010)

Reception

Box office
The film was in the Turkish box office charts for eight weeks and has made a total gross of US$778,966.

Reviews
Emrah Güler, writing in Hürriyet Daily News, describes the film as, "similar to last week’s release of novelist-cum-filmmaker Tuna Kiremitçi's Adını Sen Koy (You Name It)", and states that, "this film portrays another love triangle of the upper-middle class and is set in Eskişehir." He concludes that, "the trailer promises lame a dialog ", and he recommends the film to, "those who get a kick out of cardboard characters and far-from-subtle cliché romances as found in a recent avalanche of Turkish TV series."

References

External links
 
 
 

2009 films
2009 drama films
Films set in Turkey
Turkish black comedy films